Maciejowice is a village and municipality seat in Garwolin County, Masovian Voivodeship (east-central Poland).

Maciejowice may also refer to:
Maciejowice, Lesser Poland Voivodeship (south Poland)
Maciejowice, Świętokrzyskie Voivodeship (south-central Poland)
Maciejowice, Grójec County in Masovian Voivodeship (east-central Poland)
Maciejowice, Kozienice County in Masovian Voivodeship (east-central Poland)
Maciejowice, Siedlce County in Masovian Voivodeship (east-central Poland)
Maciejowice, Opole Voivodeship (south-west Poland)